The Coast to Coast is a non-standard multisport competition held annually in New Zealand. It starts in Kumara Beach and traditionally finished in the Christchurch suburb of Sumner, but since 2015 finishes in New Brighton. The event was created in 1983 by Christchurch personality Robin Judkins, who sold the rights to Queenstown-based tourism company Trojan Holdings in 2013. Richard Ussher took over from Judkins as race director in 2015.

History

The first Coast to Coast race was organised in 1983 by New Zealand sportsman Robin Judkins who had already been organising the three-day Alpine Ironman. The original race featured only 79 competitors and was considered a largely local event. Initially a two-day event for individuals and teams, and one-day event for individuals was added in 1987 known as the "Longest Day". Over the years, the races have increased in size, and by the race's 25th anniversary run in 2007 the field had increased to 840 participants and gained international acclaim as one of the premier adventure races in the world. Unlike some other triathlon events, drafting is allowed.

At the pre-race briefing for the tenth race, Judkins made the following statement:

Richard Ussher, who had won the event five times, questioned prior to the 2013 event whether it was time for Judkins to step aside. After organising the race for 31 years, Judkins sold the rights in May 2013 to tourism company Trojan Holdings for an undisclosed amount. Judkins was the race director once more in 2014, but just days before that year's event, Trojan Holdings announced that they had appointed Richard Ussher as the race director, to take over from Judkins after February 2014.

Originally sponsored by NZ Breweries under their Steinlager brand in Christchurch, later transferred to their Dunedin brewery Speight's together held the naming rights for 32 years but cancelled its sponsorship in May 2015, with Moa Brewing as the event's new beer sponsor. There was no naming right sponsor for the 2016 race, but in April 2016, it was announced that Kathmandu was the new naming right sponsor from 2017 to 2019.

Course

The race consists of three different timed events which all run over the same course: individual and two-person teams competing over a two-day event, and the titular World Championship race, a one-person, one-day event previously called The Longest Day competition.

The race begins with a  run from Kumara Beach on the Tasman Sea, followed by a 55 km (34 mi) cycling up State Highway 73 to Aickens. The next segment of the race is a  run up the Deception River, through Goat Pass and then down the Mingha River to the Bealey River and SH 73 at Klondyke Corner. For the two-day event, competitors overnight here. 

From Klondyke Corner, a  cycling leg along SH 73 brings competitors to the Waimakariri River at Mount White Bridge. From here, competitors kayak  down the river to the Waimakariri Gorge Bridge (Route 72). 

Until 2014, the final segment was a  cycling race along Old West Coast Road and through Christchurch (via SH 73, SH 76, SH 74A, Ferry Road and Main Road) to the finish at Sumner Beach, on the Pacific Ocean. 

From 2015, the route was shifted north of the Waimakariri River to follow South Eyre Road, then travelling through north-eastern Christchurch to finish at New Brighton beach, a total distance just 500 metres shorter than the original. The main reason for the change was to avoid competitors contending with numerous traffic lights through Christchurch's inner suburbs.

 Start line, Kumara beach:  
 Kumara Junction transition (run-cycle):  
 Aickins transition (cycle-run):  
 Klondyke Corner transition/overnight (run-cycle):  
 Mount White Bridge transition (cycle-kayak):  
 Waimakariri Gorge Bridge transition (kayak-cycle): 
 Finish line, New Brighton Beach: 
 Historic finish line, Sumner beach:

Individual races

1983 race
The inaugural race was held on 26 and 27 February, a Saturday and Sunday. There were a total of 79 competitor, of whom 77 finished the race. In the individual race, 49 competitors made it to the finish line, and 28 competitors finished in the two-person event. The race was initially only available over two days. Three competitors attended from overseas: Dave Horning was a triathlete from the United States, Tom Barichello was from Canada, and the eventual race winner in the individual men's category was English anaesthetist Joe Sherriff, who was temporarily living in Dunedin. Due to the staggered starts on the second morning, Graeme Dingle was leading Sherriff, but Sherriff would have had to cross the finish line two minutes ahead of Dingle to compensate for the staggered start. Sherriff caught the first glimpse of Dingle just outside Ferrymead and as he was riding with a strong bunch, he managed to take 4 minutes 30 seconds off Dingle, enough for a win. Of the women, Stella Sweney from Nelson won decisively, over two and a half hours ahead of Annie Hope coming in second. Sweney would win more than just her first race. The main sponsor for the event was Macpac, and Steinlager was a co-sponsor – their contribution was 20 dozen cans of beer.

1984 race
There were 139 competitors for the second event. The inaugural race received little media attention, but this changed in 1984 with James Daniels from the 3ZM radio station in Christchurch competing in the event. Daniels would stop every now and then and provide live commentary. And there was lots to talk about, as the weather was atrocious. Climbing up the Deception River, the weather deteriorated. Competitors who were slower faced ever higher water levels and could not undertake the many river crossings by themselves, but had to wait for others to link arms. The temperature at Goat Pass was 4 degrees Celsius. Despite the conditions, John Howard finished the first day 10 minutes faster than the 1983 winner's time; Howard had missed the event the previous year as he wanted to save himself for a major triathlon a week later in the United States (which, due to an administrative bungle, he could not get to).

On the second day, a southerly had come through and the Waimakariri River was in flood; eleven competitors pulled out in this section, rescued by helicopter or jet boat, or simply giving up before entering the gorge. Howard had been the race favourite and at the end of the second day, he had knocked 90 minutes off Sherriff's winning time from last year for a clear win of the men's competition. Sherriff had travelled from England to try for another win (and to marry his fiancée), but came a disappointing 18th place. Stella Sweney once more won the women's race. The main sponsor for the 1984 race was brewer Lion Brown.

1985 race
In the third year, there were 321 competitors, and the race was held on 2 and 3 February. Based on the high number of competitors who had to be rescued of the kayaking section, Judkins made it compulsory that competitors had proficiency in kayaking; either a certificate from a canoe club, surf lifesaving club, or another canoeist stating that they are a competent grade two to three paddler. It was the first time that a significant number of North Island entries were received. It was raining heavily in the mountains when the race started. The first cycling leg is remembered for a bunch of six riders encountering about 30 sheep that dashed onto the road. Dave Horning, the American who had competed in the first race, had again come to New Zealand. He described his experience running the flooded Deception River section thus:

Terry Newlands had the men's individual fastest time on the first day, but he was ill-prepared for the kayaking section. The Aucklander had brought a surf ski and had tested it on the lower Waimakariri River before the race. The conditions on the upper Waimakariri were vastly different on race day, and wearing shorts, Newlands pulled out of the race suffering from hypothermia before entering the gorge. Horning also pulled out, unable to cope with kayaking the swollen river. Brian Sander, a science technician from Wellington, won the men's individual race, 26 seconds ahead of Greg Dobson. Sandy Fletcher won the individual women's event, with Tui Elliot second and the previous winner, Stella Sweney, in third place. Fletcher had been registered for the 1984 race in a team, but had to pull out before the race due to injury; she supported her husband Bernie Fletcher instead, helping him to win the men's team category. The Fletchers had for years lived in Britain and raced in kayaking events, including at world championships. Sandy Fletcher had come fourth in the first New Zealand national road cycling championships. The 1985 Coast to Coast was the only one that she would ever enter.

Last year's individual men's winner, John Howard, had entered the team event with Eric Saggers. Ten days before the race, he had suffered a high-speed downhill crash and turned up to the race briefing "bandaged like a mummy" after having lost a lot of skin. They won the team event. The main sponsor for the 1985 race was, like the previous year, the brewer Lion Brown.

1986 race
In 1986, there were 347 competitors, including quite a number of athletes from overseas. Unlike the previous two years, the weather was fine. The character of the race had changed, and having the right gear became a much more important component. Greg Dobson was the first athlete, in 1986, to get sponsorship, and he took five months off work to train for the event. Local radio stations gave progress updates and 3,000 spectators gathered at Sumner beach to see the competitors come in. Steinlager as the main sponsor had enabled scaffolding to be erected with a large banner at the finish line. Greg Dobson was the first individual man across the line, and he won the event; the first to break the 12-hour mark. Brian Sanders came second; the two had swapped places compared to 1985. Jane Reeves, a radiographer from Christchurch, won the individual women's event; she had been leading her category from the start of the race.

1987 race
The 1987 event was held on 7 and 8 February. New Zealand Breweries was the main sponsor, and they promoted their brand Steinlager through the race. The two-day event was entered by 143 individuals and 62 two-person teams. The two-day race has long been remembered for the crash involving 20 cyclists some  into the race. 1982 Commonwealth Games gold medallist cyclist Craig Adair, who was establishing himself as a bike show owner at the time, was the event mechanic and he got cleaned out of spare parts by the crash. Terry Newlands from Auckland lost one of the sole from his shoes with an hour to go on the mountain run, and this slowed him down, but owing to a strong performance on the river, he won the men's two-day event. The fastest woman was Penny Webster, a teacher from Queenstown.

But what made the 1987 remarkable was the introduction of the "Longest Day"; the option for individual athletes to complete the event during a single day. There were 42 competitors who signed up: 40 men and 2 women. It was a gamble, as it was unknown whether humans could sustain the difficult conditions. There were other events that took a whole day to complete, most notably the Ironman World Championship that had been held on Hawaii since 1978, but none of these included such difficult conditions. Doctors were thus placed at the end of the mountain run, checking that the competitors were in a state that would allow them to continue, and none were pulled out of the field by the medical profession. The two women who entered had both previously won the two-day event: Stella Sweney in 1983 and 1984, and Jane Reeves in 1986. Reeves pulled out of the race in the kayaking section, and Sweney and her brother John stopped to rescue Reeves' kayak. The Sweney siblings were the last one-day competitors to cross the line in Sumner, but Stella Sweney added a third event title to her collection.

Of the Longest Day men, Eric Saggers was the first to finish the first bike section. He needed a good lead on Russell Prince, who was considered the stronger mountain runner, and Saggers had a lead of 2 min 29 sec. Prince overtook him up the Deception River close to Goat Pass and never saw another competitor. At Sumner, Prince had a 16-minute lead over John McKenzie, with a University of Canterbury student in third place – Steve Gurney. Saggers came fifth.

Russell Prince had, literally, first come across the event in 1984. The heavy rain had forced him and his brothers out from a hunting trip at the headwaters of the Waimakariri River. Arriving back at the main road at Klondyke Corner, they saw a congregation of people and thought it must have been a large search and rescue party; they went over to offer their help. But they had walked into the overnight camp at the end of the mountain run, and one of the competitors explained to Prince what the event involved. Intrigued, Prince decided to participate the following year. Prince came fifth in 1985, third in 1986, before winning the inaugural Longest Day in 1987.

1988 race
For the 1988 race, Judkins had set a limit of 400 competitors. He took delight in opening registrations in June of each year for the following event, and the places were snapped up within days. It was the first time that the event had sold out. New Zealand Breweries was again the main sponsor, and they promoted their brand Steinlager. For the first time, Judkins had celebrity entrants, with two former All Blacks putting their name forward: Brian Ford and Kevin Eveleigh. John Jacoby entered the Longest Day after having come second in the 1987 team event with fellow Australian Andrew Maffett, who in 1988 was his support person. Jacoby had won the three previous World Cup canoe marathons and was thus a top contender. Greg Dobson as the Longest Day race leader was five minutes ahead of Jacoby entering the river, but leaving the river, Jacoby had 14 minutes on Steve Gurney, who in turn had overtaken Dobson. Jacoby held this lead to Sumner in a time of 12:02:59 hours. He narrowly missed out on winning a NZ$35,000 Ford Laser TX3 Turbo, which was the price for the first competitor to break the 12-hour mark. In July 1988, Jacoby won the inaugural ICF Canoe Marathon World Championship.

There was only one woman competing in the Longest Day, and she was there only because Judkins had talked her into it. Denise Higgison from Tauranga was the last individual to finish the Longest Day in a time of 17:22:08 hours, but this secured her the win in her category.

The two-day individual women's race was a competition between the 1987 winner, Penny Webster, and Claire Parkes. The deciding factor was a bad crash on her bike that cost Webster seven minutes, but that also injured her and reduced her performance. In the end, Parkes won 48 minutes ahead of Webster, who came in third place. The individual men's two-day event was won by Daniel Forsyth. Greg Coyle came last in the individual two-day event, with just over 23 hours, but for him, the important thing was to have done the race. He commented later:

1989 race
A few things were new for the 1989, and some of them caused a furore. First of all, the New Zealand Tourism Department—a government agency—became involved as they recognised the potential for event tourism. They organised and funded foreign journalists to come and cover the event. One of those was English botanist David Bellamy, who did not just report from the event, but decided to compete. Another innovation was drug testing; this was Judkins' ploy to have the race known as the "World Championship of Kayak, Cycle, Run". In the end, it was the only event where drug testing was carried out, only the first three men of the Longest Day were required to give urine samples, and the samples were sent to Christchurch Hospital for testing of stimulants, rather than Canada for testing for anabolic steroids as previously announced. Gurney and Prince, who had lobbied for drug testing, were critical of the scaled-back testing regime and claimed that some competitors were using steroids. But the real controversy was caused by the sponsorship: New Zealand Breweries had decided to promote their South Island brand Speight's, and it was their sexist slogan that caused the outcry: "The stuff Southern Men are made of." Female competitors hissed and booed, and there was much discussion in the media, and media attention always pleased Judkins. People made their views known by slogans on the support vehicles. Gurney threatened to wear a dress if he managed to win the Longest Day. The brewery simply responded that their main target audience was men.

In the women's Longest Day event, Claire Parkes defeated Penny Webster. They had been neck to neck until the kayak section, where Webster pulled away. Three competitors were well clear of the rest of the field in the men's Longest Day event; at the transition to the kayak, Prince had seven minutes on Gurney, who in turn had one minute on Jacoby. The latter shone in his specialist kayaking discipline and when leaving the river had a lead of four minutes on Gurney, and eighteen minutes on Prince. On the last cycling leg, Jacoby could even increase his lead, and he finished in 11:27:19 hours. Gurney and Prince also broke the 12-hour mark, but Jacoby had won the car (that year, a Suzuki was up for grabs) and a return trip to London. Gurney thus missed out on his chance to wear a dress during the prize-giving.

In the men's individual two-day category, Doug Lomax won the race. But in either case, this was just a test-run prior to the 1990 competition, where he intended to contest the Longest Day in the veteran's category, as he would have turned 40 by then. The individual women's category was won by Vivienne Prince, the wife of Russell Prince.

Race results
The following race results are for individuals competing either in the two-day (since 1983) or one-day ("Longest Day"; since 1987) event.

Two-day results

Table footnotes
† the events were not contested on the standard course due to bad weather

Longest Day results

Individual winners of the single-day, dubbed Longest Day, event are as follows:

Table footnotes
† the events were not contested on the standard course due to bad weather

Records
The record time of completion of the race is in 10 hours, 34 minutes and 37 seconds, achieved by Keith Murray in 1994.  Murray also holds the record for the two-day competition at 11:05:18 from the year before in 1993.

Steve Gurney, a local from Christchurch, has won the event a record nine times, in 1990, 1991, and 1997–2003. Of the women, Kathy Lynch is the record holder with five wins between 1991 and 1996. Elina Ussher, with four wins to her name, was keen to equal Lynch's five wins in 2018 but came fourth.

Notes

References

External links
 Coast to Coast official website

Multisports in New Zealand
Arthur's Pass National Park